Independencia Department may refer to:

Independencia Department, Chaco
Independencia Department, La Rioja

Department name disambiguation pages